IIIE may refer to:
 Indian Institution of Industrial Engineering
 Dassault Mirage IIIE, a French fighter aircraft
 Horten H.IIIe, a German experimental glider
 Palm IIIe, a PDA
 Titan IIIE, a rocket

See also 
 Ille